The women's pole vault at the 2018 IAAF World Indoor Championships took place on 3 March 2018.

Summary
With only 12 entrants, no preliminary round was held.  Six women cleared 4.70 m, with Anzhelika Sidorova remaining perfect, and Olympic champion Katerina Stefanidi using it as her opening height.  Sidorova passed at 4.75 m, while Eliza McCartney then Sandi Morris cleared on their first attempts, Morris taking the lead on fewer misses.  Stefanidi cleared on her second attempt to take over third place, so Katie Nageotte passed, while Alysha Newman took her three misses and exited.  Sidorova retook the lead, clearing 4.80 m, while Morris and Stefanidi cleared it on their last attempts.  McCartney and Nageotte exited.  Morris and Stefanidi missed their first attempts then passed after Sidorova remained perfect over 4.85 m.  With only two attempts left, Morris cleared on her last attempt at 4.90 m to stay in the competition.  Stefanidi missed and settled for the bronze. Sidorova cleared on her third attempt but relinquished the lead.  At a championship record , neither could get over on their first two attempts, but then Morris cleared on her final attempt, which turned into gold when Sidorova missed her third.  Still in the competition, Morris had the bar raised to a world record .  Surrounded by the drama of the men's 60 metres, Morris made two credible attempts at the record, the last more than 3 hours and 15 minutes after warming up at the beginning of the competition.

Records

Results
The final was started at 18:00.

References

Pole vault
Pole vault at the World Athletics Indoor Championships
2018 in women's athletics